Dracocephalum parviflorum, known as dragonhead mint or American dragonhead, is a wild North American mint growing across much of the United States (especially in the Great Lakes region and in the deserts and mountains of the West), as well as much of Canada and Alaska. It grows as either an annual or biennial, producing clusters of small pink to violet flowers in whorls at the ends of many branching stems. The seeds are very small (about 2 mm), dark, and high in oil content, about 20%.

A recent study suggests that this mint may have application as a commercial birdseed crop in Alaska.

References

Flora of North America
Plants described in 1818
parviflorum